LaMar F. Clark (December 1, 1933 – November 5, 2006) was an American professional boxer who fought in the heavyweight division. He was active from 1958 to 1961 and fought a recorded 46 times in his 3 year-career, mostly in his home state of Utah. The Guinness Book of World Records lists Clark as the boxer with the most consecutive knockouts (44), and also the most knockouts in one night (six). Clark's knockout streak garnered him nationwide press attention, though some commentators have derided the poor quality of his opposition.

Amateur career
Clark claimed an amateur record of 25–2, winning a regional Golden Gloves championship in the process.

Professional career
Clark was managed by Merv Jensen, who also managed middleweight champion Gene Fullmer. He made his professional debut on January 4, 1958, winning a six round decision over John Hicks. Subsequently, Clark won his next 44 bouts by knockout. The Historical Dictionary of Boxing describes the quality of his opposition in these bouts as "poor". None was a rated contender and most had little or no professional experience. In a December 1959 column reflecting on Clark's long KO streak, Red Smith wrote: "Up to now Clark has been whipping sheep herders and streetcar conductors", and thus reserved judgement on his ability.

To build publicity for Clark, Jensen arranged for him to fight twice in one night; Clark won both bouts by KO. Clark followed up by knocking out three opponents on 10 November 1958 and six opponents on 1 December 1958 (including five in the first round and one within 7 seconds). Another of Clark's wins was against Tony Burton, who later appeared in the Rocky movies, in a bout refereed by Jack Dempsey. On 11 January 1960, Clark knocked out Kenneth Hayden, his 44th consecutive knockout, surpassing the previous record held by Billy Fox.

In April 1960, Clark was matched with Bartolo Soni, described as a "tough journeyman" who had never been knocked out. Clark was unable to KO Soni and was himself stopped in the ninth round. Clark then fought Pete Rademacher, the 1956 Olympic gold medalist and former heavyweight title contender; Rademacher won by a tenth round knockout. His last fight was on April 19, 1961 against Cassius Clay (later Muhammad Ali). Clay broke Clark's nose and knocked him out in the second round. Clark retired after this fight.

Other sources state that Clark had 42 or 45 knockouts.

Personal life
Clark died on November 5, 2006 aged 72.  Clark was survived by his wife of 46 years, Brenda and his daughters Nicole Clark-Romano, Cherese Jones and Theresa Clark.  As well as son-in-laws Tony Romano and Brent Jones and Theresa’s son, Dillen LaMar Clark.

Professional boxing record

References

External links
 (history)

1934 births
2006 deaths
People from Cedar City, Utah
Boxers from Utah
Heavyweight boxers
American male boxers